Kirkheaton is a village and former civil parish  north-east of Huddersfield, now in the parish of Kirkburton, in the county of West Yorkshire, England, Historically, it is part of the West Riding of Yorkshire. It is in the Dalton ward of the Metropolitan Borough of Kirklees. In 1931 the parish had a population of 2,610.

History 
The name Heaton comes from Old English "Heah" meaning high and "tun" meaning settlement along with Old Norse "Kirk" meaning church.

Governance 
On 1 April 1938 the parish was abolished and merged with Kirkburton and Huddersfield. From 1894 to 1938 Kirkheaton was also an urban district.

Parish Church
The Parish church in Kirkheaton, dedicated to St John the Baptist, is one of the earliest churches in the area, there was a stone church on the site before the Norman Conquest. In the churchyard is a fine memorial to a disaster which shook the nation in 1818, a horrific fire in a local cotton mill, Colne Bridge Mill, in which 14 workers, all girls and many of them very young, were trapped and lost their lives.

Education 
Kirkheaton has a primary school, Kirkheaton Primary School, which is situated on New Road.

Notable people 
 England cricketers George Herbert Hirst, Allen Hill and Wilfred Rhodes were born in the village and played cricket for Kirkheaton Cricket Club. Also the cricketers, William Bates, John Thewlis Senior, and Lewis Wrathmell, were also all born in the village and played for Yorkshire County Cricket Club.

See also
Listed buildings in Kirkburton

References

Villages in West Yorkshire
Former civil parishes in West Yorkshire
Kirkburton